Rolf Waaler (15 February 1898 - 10 July 2000) was a Norwegian organizational psychologist. He served as the third rector of the Norwegian School of Economics (NHH) from 1958-1963. His mother was composer Fredrikke Waaler.

He was educated at the Norwegian Institute of Technology and was Commander of the order of St. Olav.

References

1898 births
2000 deaths
Norwegian centenarians
Men centenarians
Academic staff of the Norwegian School of Economics
Rectors of the Norwegian School of Economics
20th-century Norwegian economists